The VSR-84 "Dubok" (also "Butan" or "Butane") is a tricolor military camouflage designed for the Soviet Armed Forces in 1984. After the dissolution of the USSR, it was used by the Armed Forces of Ukraine until 2014.

They're sometimes known as TTsKO .

History
The Dubok was developed in 1984 for the former Soviet Army. They were used by the Soviet Air Forces and Soviet Airborne Forces.

Russian service
The Dubok was seen with Russian spetsnaz forces deployed in 1992 during the Transnistria War as "peacekeepers".

The pattern was seen with officers while privates and other soldiers were using the VSR-93.

Ukrainian service
Then-president Leonid Kuchma said in July 1993 that the Ukrainian military would receive new camouflage uniforms, but it was never issued. Duboks in Ukrainian service were replaced by digital camouflage in 2014. At the time, it was reported that Ukraine obtained Dubok fabric from Belarusian and Chinese producers.

The Dubok was last used by Ukrainian troops in 2014 during the Donbass War, which was replaced by the MM14.

Design
The color scheme "oak", known as "amoeba", consists of a light green background, on which spots of green and brown colors are applied. Camouflage is designed to blur the silhouette at long and close distances.

Variants

Belarus
Belarus formerly used a clone of the Ukrainian Dubok desert variant.

Croatia
Croatia used Soviet-era dubok as basis for clones made during the Croatian War of Independence.

Estonia
Estonia made their versions of the TTsKO after it gained independence with inconsistent green colors.

Moldova
Moldova used Ukrainian-made duboks, but with whorl-based shapes on the pattern.

Ukraine
A desert variant was developed based on the Ukrainian version of the Dubok.

Users

Current

Partially-recognized states

Former
 : Formerly used by Armenian border guard forces.
 : Used by Azeri border guard in the 1990s after the fall of the USSR.
 : Known to be used by Belarusian airborne and special forces units. Ukrainian desert variant used in 2003-2004 with Belarusian soldiers in peacekeeping missions in desert scenarios.
 : Croatian clones of Soviet-era duboks used in the Croatian war of independence in 1991.
 : Formerly used by Estonian military and border guard forces. Some uniforms were based on local TTsKO camouflage.
 : Used by Kyrgyz military in the 1990s.
 : Moldovan troops used a variant of the Soviet-era TTsKo from 1991 to 1995.
 : Adopted in 1991. Replaced later on by the VSR/Dubok in 1991 for specialist units in the Russian military before the rest of the military and the MVD received the pattern in 1994.
 : Kninjas paramilitary forces used one piece coverall uniforms made from M82-based TTsKo. 
 : Until dissolution in 1991, passed onto successor states.
 : Used by the Armed Forces of Ukraine until 2014. Replaced from service with the MM14.

References

Bibliography
 
 
 

Webarchive template wayback links
Camouflage patterns
Ukrainian military uniforms
Military camouflage
Military equipment of Ukraine
Military equipment introduced in the 1980s